The Overture to Tannhäuser is an 1869 oil on canvas painting by Paul Cézanne, now in the Hermitage Museum, in Saint Petersburg. It came from the Moscow collection of Ivan Morozov. The painting shows Cézanne's sisters at their home near Aix-en-Provence. Its title refers to the work played by the pianist on the left, the overture to the Wagner opera Tannhäuser.

See also
List of paintings by Paul Cézanne

References

1869 paintings
Paintings by Paul Cézanne
Paintings in the collection of the Hermitage Museum